Hydrophilus  is a genus of beetles in the family Hydrophilidae, the water scavenger beetles. There are 53 species in three subgenera in the genus: Hydrophilus, Dibolocelus, and Temnopterus.<ref>{{cite journal |title=Giant water scavenger beetles Hydrophilus subgenus Dibolocelus' (Coleoptera: Hydrophilidae) from Mexico with description of two new species |journal=Zootaxa |year=2021 |first1=Roberto |last1=Arce-Pérez |first2=Emmanuel |last2=Arriaga-Varela |first3=Rodolfo |last3=Novelo-Gutiérrez |first4=Josè L. |last4=Navarrete-Heredia |doi=10.11646/ZOOTAXA.5027.3.5 |volume=5027 |issue=3 |pages=387–407}}</ref>

List of species
Subgenus Dibolocelus Hydrophilus gibbosus (Régimbart, 1901)
 Hydrophilus harpe Short and McIntosh, 2015
 Hydrophilus iricolor (Régimbart, 1901)
 Hydrophilus masculinus (Régimbart, 1901)
 Hydrophilus nucleoensis Arce-Pérez & Arriaga-Varela, 2021
 Hydrophilus oberthueri (Régimbart, 1901)
 Hydrophilus ovatus Gemminger and Harold 1868
 Hydrophilus palpalis Brullé, 1838
 Hydrophilus pollens Sharp, 1887
 Hydrophilus pseudovatus Arce-Pérez & Arriaga-Varela, 2021
 Hydrophilus purpuracens (Régimbart, 1901)
 Hydrophilus smaragdinus Brullé, 1837
 Hydrophilus violaceonitens Jacquelin du Val, 1857
Subgenus Hydrophilus Hydrophilus acuminatus Motschulsky, 1853
 Hydrophilus albipes Castelnau, 1840
 Hydrophilus aterrimus (Eschscholtz, 1822)
 Hydrophilus australis Montrouzier, 1860
 Hydrophilus bedeli (Régimbart, 1901)
 Hydrophilus bilineatus (MacLeay, 1825)
 Hydrophilus brevispina Fairmaire, 1879
 Hydrophilus cavicrus (Kuwert, 1893)
 Hydrophilus cavisternum (Bedel, 1891)
 Hydrophilus dauricus Mannerheim, 1852
 Hydrophilus ensifer Brullé, 1837
 Hydrophilus flavicornis Castelnau, 1840
 Hydrophilus foveolatus (Régimbart, 1901)
 Hydrophilus guarani (Bachmann, 1966)
 Hydrophilus hackeri (Orchymont, 1937)
 Hydrophilus hastatus (Herbst, 1779)
 Hydrophilus indicus (Bedel, 1891)
 Hydrophilus infrequens Watts, 1988
 Hydrophilus insularis Laporte de Castelnau, 1840
 Hydrophilus latipalpus Castelnau, 1840
 Hydrophilus loriai (Régimbart, 1901)
 Hydrophilus macronyx (Régimbart, 1901)
 Hydrophilus mesopotamiae (Kniz, 1914)
 Hydrophilus novaeguineae Watts, 1988
 Hydrophilus olivaceus Fabricius, 1781
 Hydrophilus pedipalpus (Bedel, 1891)
 Hydrophilus piceus (Linnaeus, 1758) – great silver water beetle
 Hydrophilus pistaceus Laporte de Castelnau, 1840
 Hydrophilus regimbarti (Zaitzev, 1908)
 Hydrophilus rufocinctus (Bedel, 1891)
 Hydrophilus senegalensis (Percheron, 1835)
 Hydrophilus simulator (Bedel, 1891)
 Hydrophilus sternitalis (Reitter, 1906)
 Hydrophilus temnopteroides (Orchymont, 1913)
 Hydrophilus triangularis Say, 1823 – giant water scavenger beetle
 Hydrophilus unguicularis (Régimbart, 1901)
 Hydrophilus wattsi Hansen, 1999
Subgenus Temnopterus Hydrophilus aculeatus (Solier, 1834)
 Hydrophilus rufomarginatus'' Hansen, 1999

References

Hydrophilidae genera
Hydrophilinae